Pierre François Xavier de Charlevoix, S.J. (24 or 29 October 1682 – 1 February 1761) was a French Jesuit priest, traveller, and historian, often considered the first historian of New France. He had little interest for "a life of suffering and deprivation for the conversion of Indian souls", but "an eager curiosity concerning life".

Name
Charlevoix's name also appears as Pierre-François-Xavier de Charlevoix,  Pierre De Charlevoix, and François-Xavier de Charlevoix.

Life

Charlevoix was born at Saint-Quentin in the province of Picardy on 24 or 29 October 1682. A descendant from a line of lesser nobility, his father held the post of deputy attorney general. His ancestors had served in positions in "great trust and high responsibility" such as legal officers, aldermen, and mayors.

On 15 September 1698, at age 16, he entered the Jesuit novitiate in Paris. He studied philosophy at the College Louis-le-Grand from 1700 to 1704. Between 1705 and 1709, Charlevoix was sent for his period of training in the Society called the regency to the Jesuit College in Quebec in the French colony of Canada, where he taught grammar. Upon completion of this stage of his training, Charlevoix returned to the College Louis-le-Grand in Paris to study theology, becoming a professor of belles lettres.  One of his students was the young Voltaire, who later developed strong views on New France. (See A few acres of snow.) Charlevoix was ordained as a priest in 1713. In 1715, he published his first complete work, on the establishment and progress of the Catholic Church in Japan, adding extensive notes on the manners, customs, and costumes of the inhabitants of the Empire and its general political situation, and on the topography and natural history of the region.

Charlevoix's work was halted by a royal commission that requested a survey of the historic boundaries of Acadia, a French North American colony recently lost to the British in the 1713 Treaty of Utrecht. He sailed from La Rochelle in June 1720 and reached Quebec by the end of September. His knowledge of North America led to an extension of his assignment, under instructions to find a route to the "Western Sea" (i.e., the Pacific Ocean) but "still give the impression of being no more than a traveler or missionary." Having recently lost control of the Hudson Bay and lacking funds for a major expedition, the French Crown equipped Charlevoix with two canoes, eight experienced companions, and basic trading merchandise. From Quebec, he set out for the colony of Saint-Domingue via the Saint Lawrence River and the Great Lakes to Michilimackinac, where he made an excursion to the southern edge of Green Bay. He traveled along the eastern shore of Lake Michigan, trying to reach the Illinois River from the Chicago, but the shallowness of the water forced him up the St. Joseph to the headwaters of the Theakiki, whose waters fall into the Illinois River. He traveled along the Illinois until he reached the Mississippi River in 1721, which he considered "the finest confluence in the world".| Visiting the Illinois Country along the way, Charlevoix traveled down the Mississippi to its mouth at the Gulf Coast. He embarked on a ship at New Orleans for the sail to the island of Saint-Domingue in the Caribbean, but it was wrecked at the entrance of the Bahama Channel. He was aided by nuns of the order of the Ursulines of Quebec, whose founder StMarie of the Incarnation later was the subject of one of his books. Charlevoix and his companions returned to the Mississippi River via following the coast of Florida.

Charlevoix's second trip to Saint-Domingue was more fortunate. He arrived in the colony at the beginning of September 1722. He departed for France at the end of that month, landing at Le Havre on 24 December. Charlevoix kept a record of his entire expedition, which he published as the Journal d'un voyage fait par l'ordre du Roi dans l'Amérique Septentrionale de la Nouvelle France Charlevoix's records of local geography were later used to improve regional maps. Unsuccessful in reaching the Pacific, he reported upon his return to France in 1722 of two possible routes: by the Missouri River, "whose source is certainly not far from the sea", or by the establishment of a mission in Sioux territory, from which contact with tribes further west may have been possible.

In 1723, Charlevoix traveled to Italy.

For twenty-two years, from 1733 to 1755, Charlevoix was one of the directors of the Mémoires or Journal de Trévoux, a monthly journal of literature, history, and science. On the pages of that journal, he lay down in 1735 the plan for a corpus of histories that should have given an all-inclusive account of the extra-European world. The plan was announced when his history of Japan—the first installment of the proposed series—was about to be published. In 1744 he published his History of New France, drawing on various authors as well as his own observations, thus providing the most comprehensive book on the history and geography of the French colony.

His death, at La Flèche on 1 February 1761, prevented him from developing his history of New France beyond 1736.

Legacy
Many places are named after him, listed here.

The region of Charlevoix near Quebec City is one, as are
Charlevoix County and its county seat Charlevoix, Michigan in the state of Michigan. The Montreal Metro has a station named after him.

Works
Charlevoix's works, enumerated in the Bibliographie des Peres de la Compagnie de Jesus (Bibliography of Jesuit Priests) by Carlos Sommervogel, fall into two groups. Several of his works have maps by the French philosophe (Enlightenment intellectual) and engineer Jacques-Nicolas Bellin, which represent the most accurate material of the time. His History and General Description of New France was of capital importance for Canadian history. His History and General Description of Japan was an expansion on the prior work of Engelbert Kaempfer.

 , reprinted 1829.
Volume I
Volume II
Volume III
 . 
 . 
 . 
 . 
 
Volume I
Volume II
 
Volume I
Volume II
Volume III
 .
 
Volume I
Volume II
 
Volume I
Volume II
Volume III
 .
 .
 .
 
Volume I
Volume II
Volume III
Volume IV 
 
Volume I
Volume II
 

See also Charlevoix's work in Lénardon's index to the Journal du Trévoir.

See also
 Other Charlevoixes

References

Sources

External links
 

Roman Catholic priests in New France
18th-century Canadian historians
Canadian male non-fiction writers
French entomologists
18th-century French Jesuits
French naturalists
1682 births
1761 deaths
Upper Peninsula of Michigan
Northern Michigan